0 series or 0-series may refer to:

 0 Series Shinkansen, a Japanese train series
 Zero batch, pre-production run in product manufacturing
 Zero (Italian TV series), an Italian drama
 Zero (Singaporean TV series), a 2004 drama

See also
 O series (disambiguation)
 1 series (disambiguation)
 A series (disambiguation)